Illya Eduardovych Skrypnyk (born 25 June 2003) is a Ukrainian professional footballer who plays as a central midfielder for Ukrainian First League club Bukovyna Chernivtsi, on loan from Dynamo Kyiv.

Career statistics

Club

References

External links
 
 

2003 births
Living people
Sportspeople from Chernivtsi Oblast
Ukrainian footballers
Association football midfielders
FC Dynamo Kyiv players
FC Bukovyna Chernivtsi players
Ukrainian First League players